James Grierson (2 July 1791–22 January 1875) was a Scottish minister who served as Moderator of the General Assembly to the Free Church of Scotland in 1854/55.

Early life

He was born in Ruthwell in Dumfriesshire on 2 July 1791.

He studied divinity at the University of Edinburgh. He was licensed by Presbytery of Stirling on 22 September 1816. He subsequently became tutor to Sir David Kinloch of Gilmerton, Bart. He was presented by John Lee Allen of Errol, 15 January, and ordained on 12 August 1819.

In 1816 he was licensed to preach and began his ministry in Stirling as a minister for the Church of Scotland. In 1819 he moved to Errol and remained minister of the established church there until the Disruption of 1843.

Post Disruption
In 1843 he (and the bulk of the congregation) established the Free Church of Scotland in Errol. He remained in this role until his death in 1875. He was elected as Moderator of Free Church General Assembly on 18 May 1854. He was awarded a doctorate D.D. from Edinburgh University on 25 March 1854.

He died on 22 January 1875 and is buried near his parents in Ruthwell churchyard.

Publications
A Doctrinal and Practical Treatise on the Lord's Supper
Believers reminded of the Increasing Nearness of their Salvation (Edinburgh, 1833)
Nicodemus, A Treatise on the Lord's Supper (Edinburgh, 1839)
Voices from the Cross (Edinburgh, 1855)
Heaven upon Earth, or Interviews with the Risen Saviour (Edinburgh, 1856)
The Divine Supplicant and Intercessor (Edinburgh, 1867)
Sermon LXIL, Lecture XXII. (Free Church Pulpit, ii., iii.).

Bibliography
The Lyons of Cossins, 73
Annals of the Disruption
The Evangel in Gowrie, 363.

Artistic recognition

He was photographed by Hill & Adamson in 1855. He was photographed in 1860 at the foot of the steps to New College with several other ex-Moderators of the Free Church.

Family
In 1822 he married Margaret Moncrieff (died 8 April 1875), daughter of Dr George Moncrieff of Perth, and granddaughter of Rev George Lyon of Longforgan and had issue:
Jessy Moncrieff, born 21 December 1822
Elizabeth Ann, born 9 October 1825 (married John Chalmers, M.D.), died 24 November 1891
David James, born 29 June 1827, died 11 July 1829
George Moncrieff, merchant, Glasgow, born 7 May 1829, died 4 February 1896
Margaret Jane Jemima, born 21 February 1831, died 21 March 1891
James Kinloch, born 24 February, and died 30 March 1834
James Lyon Maxwell, born 20 November 1835.

References
Citations

Sources

1791 births
1875 deaths
People from Dumfries and Galloway
19th-century Ministers of the Free Church of Scotland
Alumni of the University of Edinburgh